Pasquale Gesuito (born 13 August 1959) is an Italian bobsledder. He competed at the 1984, 1988, 1992 and the 1994 Winter Olympics.

References

1959 births
Living people
Italian male bobsledders
Olympic bobsledders of Italy
Bobsledders at the 1984 Winter Olympics
Bobsledders at the 1988 Winter Olympics
Bobsledders at the 1992 Winter Olympics
Bobsledders at the 1994 Winter Olympics
Sportspeople from Bari